The A Rush of Blood to the Head Tour was the second concert tour undertaken by British rock band Coldplay. It was launched in support of their second studio album A Rush of Blood to the Head. They performed a total of 151 shows across Europe, Asia, Oceania and the Americas. Between 21 and 23 July 2003, the band filmed Coldplay Live 2003 at the Hordern Pavilion, Sydney.

Background
Overall, Coldplay's concerts during this period showcased its progression as a bona fide live act.  The band began playing more shows in arenas and amphitheatres, moving away from the club venues that dominated earlier tours.  Shows also had more elaborate stage and lighting effects.  For example, strobe lighting for the song "Daylight" featured the image of a rotating sun superimposed over the stage. Taking a cue from U2's Elevation Tour and Nine Inch Nails' Fragility Tour, Coldplay also adopted a series of back screens that displayed video footage of each band member simultaneously.

Other highlights included:
Lead singer Chris Martin sang with Ron Sexsmith on the track, "Gold in Them Hills" during the headline set.
An ambient, instrumental introduction before the start of "Politik" for every show. This can particularly be heard on the Live 2003 DVD. Note: Not the same as the Brian Eno introduction sometimes used before this intro.
Guitarist Jonny Buckland regularly played a harmonica solo on the track "Don't Panic".  He tossed the harmonica into the crowd after the solo's completion. Buckland also performed an original electric guitar introduction for the track.
The aforementioned back screens were unfurled mid-concert, usually during the beginning of "One I Love".
At some shows, Martin sang lyrics after inhaling from a helium balloon.
Martin usually wore a Make Trade Fair T-shirt during 2002 shows to promote the Oxfam campaign.  Make Trade Fair booths were present at venues, where concert-goers could sign petitions and learn about the campaign's objectives.
An specially created, ambient introduction for "Yellow", featuring a dark and gloomy tone. Martin sings the lyrics, "Your skin... Oh-oh-oh..." during the introduction, which afterwards leads to the regular start of the song.

Opening acts
Most of the tour included at least one supporting act on each concert, with English singer Richard Hawley opening all performances held between 19 and 28 June 2002. Except for the show at Rome's Valle Giulia (which had the Music), all dates from 30 June to 12 July included 1 Giant Leap. For the second North American leg, Coldplay invited Northern Irish band Ash, while the third European run featured Idlewild. In 2003, Ron Sexsmith opened for the band from 21 January to 9 February. He was succeeded by the Music starting from 24 February. As Coldplay returned to Europe for a fourth leg, Feeder was chosen as their support and Ian McCulloch additionally guested in the United Kingdom. The last North American run counted with Eisley, who were joined by Damien Rice on 25 May, and Sexsmith between 27 May and 13 June. During the tour's final months, Coldplay went to Asia, Oceania and Latin America: the first two continents had Betchadupa, while Mexico featured Jumbo.

Concert synopsis

The 2002 shows contained a rough 50/50 split in material from Parachutes and A Rush of Blood to the Head. The official tour in 2003 focused on songs from the second album, as well as many unreleased tracks. For example, the future Live 2003 song "Moses" and "Fix You" B-side "Pour Me" were introduced during the tour. Other new songs included future X&Y b-sides, "Gravity" & "Proof", "Your World Turns Upside Down", which would later become a completely different song called "The World Turned Upside Down" as another b-side to "Fix You", and an unreleased piano ballad called "A Ladder to the Sun".

Coldplay also made a habit of covering other artists on the tour, often as outros to their own songs. Covers ranged from a tongue-in-cheek excerpt of Avril Lavigne's "Sk8er Boi" to the Louis Armstrong classic "What a Wonderful World".  Coldplay also regularly covered Echo & the Bunnymen's "Lips Like Sugar" in its entirety, in homage to Ian McCulloch's role as a mentor during the recording of A Rush of Blood to the Head.

The musical introduction to the concert featured selections from Brian Eno's Apollo: Atmospheres and Soundtracks.

Commercial performance 
According to report from Pollstar, the concerts held during 2003 around the world have sold 341,201 tickets in total. The North American shows from said year have grossed $8.6 million from 306,917 tickets sold in 42 reported dates in total. In total, the tour grossed $27,594,458 from 879,050 tickets in 121 reported dates.

Set list
This set list was taken from the band's 22 July 2003 concert in Sydney, Australia. It does not represent all shows throughout the tour.

"Politik"
"God Put a Smile upon Your Face"
"A Rush of Blood to the Head"
"Daylight"
"Trouble"
"One I Love"
"Don't Panic"
"Shiver"
"See You Soon"
"Everything's Not Lost"
"Moses"
"Yellow"
"The Scientist"
"What a Wonderful World" (Louis Armstrong cover)

Encore
"Clocks"
"In My Place"
"Amsterdam"
"Life Is for Living"

Tour dates

Cancelled shows

Boxscore

Personnel
Credits taken from the band's official tour book, which was sold exclusively on merchandise booths and their online store.

Performing members
 Chris Martin – lead vocals, piano, rhythm guitar
 Jonny Buckland – lead guitar, backing vocals, keyboards
 Guy Berryman – bass, backing vocals, keyboards, percussion
 Will Champion – drums, backing vocals, percussion

Main crew
 Brian Leitch – lighting designer
 Chris Woods – monitor engineer
 Craig Hope – backline technician
 Dan Green – FoH engineer
 Derek Fudge – production manager
 Dave Holmes – US band manager
 Jeff Dray – tour manager
 Dana White – Dave Holmes assistant
 Miller – gadget technician
 Nick Whitehouse – visual technician
 Sean Buttery – backline technician
 Shari Webber – production assistant
 Thomas Golseth – tour accountant
 Tony Smith – VDOSC technician
 Vicki Taylor – band assistant
 Rocky Hudson – security
 Matt McGinn – backline technician
 Holly Tickett – Estelle Wilkinson assistant
 Estelle Wilkinson – band manager
 Steve Strange – Europe/World agent
 Marty Diamond – US agent

Additional US crew
 Chris Conti
 David Favoritta
 Pat Thompson
 Bryan Kiger
 John Taylor
 Jim Lee
 Steve Capozza
 Glen Jones
 Sam Philips
 Eric Wagner
 Scotty Daum
 Jerry Martin
 Dave Cheek

Additional European crew
 Ben Holdsworth
 Ivan Ellison
 Jim Allison
 Tom James
 Alan Yates
 Stewart Kennet
 Aaron Hopkins
 Nick Davids
 Al McCauly
 Jerry Milichip
 Eddie Monk
 Jim Thompson
 Ian Heath
 Graham Dietricht
 John Burgess
 Matt Clarke
 Steven Connelly
 Ken Needham

Suppliers
 Andy Lovell, Mike Llewellyn – EFM Management
 Tour Tech – PA
 Siyan – lights
 Fly by Nite – trucks
 SilverGrey – buses
 Alistage – stage
 Pitstop – barrier
 XL Video – video
 Lasergrafix – laser
 Depot – rehearsals
 John Henry's – storage
 Matt Snowball Music – anything at any time
 Heidi Varah, Pauline Austin, Ben Albertson – catering
 Merchandising for Life – merchandise

Tour book
 Giles Greenwood, Joe Hosp – design
 Kevin Westenberg – photography
 Edwin Ingram – photographic printing
 Matt Wilson Labs  – B&W

See also
 List of Coldplay live performances
 List of highest-grossing live music artists

Notes

References

External links

Coldplay Official Website

2002 concert tours
2003 concert tours
Coldplay concert tours
Concert tours of Asia
Concert tours of Australia
Concert tours of Belgium
Concert tours of Canada
Concert tours of Denmark
Concert tours of Europe
Concert tours of France
Concert tours of Germany
Concert tours of Ireland
Concert tours of Italy
Concert tours of Japan
Concert tours of Mexico
Concert tours of New Zealand
Concert tours of Norway
Concert tours of North America
Concert tours of Oceania
Concert tours of Portugal
Concert tours of South America
Concert tours of Spain
Concert tours of Sweden
Concert tours of Switzerland
Concert tours of Thailand
Concert tours of the Netherlands
Concert tours of the United Kingdom
Concert tours of the United States